Vincent Tong may refer to: 

 Vincent Tong (voice actor)
 Vincent Tong (politician)